Nargesabad (also Romanized as Nargesābād; also known as Nargesī, Narges Zār, and Narjesī) is a village in Jereh Rural District, Jereh and Baladeh District, Kazerun County, Fars Province, Iran. At the 2006 census, its population was 193, in 42 families.

References 

Populated places in Kazerun County